The 30th Anniversary Concert Celebration is a live double-album release in recognition of Bob Dylan's 30 years as a recording artist. Recorded on October 16, 1992, at Madison Square Garden in New York City, it captures most of the concert, which featured many artists performing classic Dylan songs, before ending with three songs from Dylan himself.

The house band for the show were the surviving members of Booker T. & the M.G.'s: Booker T. Jones on organ, Donald "Duck" Dunn on bass, and Steve Cropper on guitar. Joining them was drummer Anton Fig filling in for the late Al Jackson, plus drummer Jim Keltner. Longtime Saturday Night Live bandleader  and initial lead guitar player in Dylan's Never Ending Tour G. E. Smith served as the music director of the whole event as well as a sideman on guitar and mandolin for several artists. Background singers were Sheryl Crow and Sue Medley among others.

The 30th Anniversary Concert Celebration, which reached No. 40 (in the US and went gold), was released in August 1993 just before Dylan was about to deliver his second folk studio set inside of a year, World Gone Wrong. The concert was dubbed "Bobfest" by Neil Young at the beginning of his "All Along the Watchtower" cover.

A VHS collection of the same name was released on August 25, 1993. On March 4, 2014, the concert was released in Deluxe Edition 2-DVD and Blu-ray sets with bonus performances and behind-the-scenes rehearsal footage, as well as a 2-CD set with two bonus rehearsal tracks.

Track listing

Personnel
Bob Dylan – guitar, vocals, harmonica

Additional musicians

The Band
Rick Danko – guitar, bass guitar, vocals
Levon Helm – mandolin, vocals
Garth Hudson – accordion
Richard Bell – accordion
Randy Ciarlante - drums, vocals
Jim Weider – guitar, vocals
Jerry Barnes – choir, chorus
Katreese Barnes – choir, chorus
Mary Chapin Carpenter – guitar, vocals
John Cascella – accordion, keyboards
Johnny Cash – vocals
June Carter Cash – vocals
Rosanne Cash – guitar, vocals
Tracy Chapman – guitar, vocals
The Clancy Brothers
Bobby Clancy – bodhrán, vocals
Liam Clancy – guitar, vocals
Paddy Clancy – harmonica, vocals
Eric Clapton – guitar, vocals
Leotis Clyburn – choir, chorus
Dennis Collins – background vocals, choir, chorus
Shawn Colvin – guitar, vocals
Steve Cropper – guitar
Sheryl Crow – background vocals, choir, chorus
Donald "Duck" Dunn – bass guitar

Ron Fair – piano
Anton Fig – percussion, drums
Lisa Germano – violin
Nanci Griffith – guitar, vocals (home video edition only)
David Grissom – guitar
George Harrison – guitar, vocals
Richie Havens – guitar, vocals
Sophie B. Hawkins – vocals
Carolyn Hester – vocals
Cissy Houston – choir, chorus
Chrissie Hynde – guitar, vocals
Darryl Keith John – background vocals
Booker T. Jones – organ
Jim Keltner – drums
Brenda King – background vocals, choir, chorus
Curtis King – background vocals, choir, chorus
Al Kooper – organ
Kris Kristofferson – guitar, vocals
Tommy Makem – banjo, vocals
Kerry Marx – guitar
Mike McCready – guitar
Roger McGuinn – guitar, vocals
Sue Medley – background vocals
John Mellencamp – vocals
Willie Nelson – guitar, vocals
Robbie O'Connell – guitar, vocals

Sinead O'Connor – vocals
Christine Ohlman – background vocals, choir, chorus
The O'Jays
Eddie Levert – vocals
Sam Strain – vocals
Walter Williams – vocals
Pat Peterson – percussion, background vocals
Tom Petty and the Heartbreakers
Mike Campbell – guitar
Howie Epstein – guitar, lap-steel guitar, bass guitar, vocals
Stan Lynch – drums
Tom Petty – guitar, vocals
Benmont Tench – organ
Mickey Raphael – harmonica
Lou Reed – guitar, vocals
G. E. Smith – music director, guitar, mandolin, bass
George Thorogood – guitar
Eddie Vedder – vocals
Mike Wanchic – guitar
Don Was – bass guitar
Johnny Winter – guitar, vocals
Stevie Wonder – harmonica, piano, vocals
Ronnie Wood – guitar, vocals
Neil Young – guitar, vocals
Reggie Young – guitar

Technical
Jeff Kramer- production

Don DeVito – production
Jeff Rosen – production

David Hewitt Engineer Remote Recording Services Silver Truck
David Thoener – mixing
Kevin Wall – executive production

David Wild – liner notes

Certifications

See also
List of songs written by Bob Dylan
List of artists who have covered Bob Dylan songs

References

External links
 

1993 live albums
1993 video albums
2014 video albums
Albums produced by Don DeVito
Albums recorded at Madison Square Garden
Bob Dylan live albums
Bob Dylan tribute albums
Bob Dylan video albums
Columbia Records live albums
Columbia Records video albums
Live video albums